WRKY (1490 kHz, "Rocky 98.5") is a commercial AM radio station licensed to Lancaster, Pennsylvania. The station is owned by Forever Media and simulcasts the classic rock programming of sister station 98.5 WYCR. WRKY is one of Pennsylvania's oldest radio stations.

WRKY is powered at 600 watts, using a non-directional antenna. The transmitter is off Fruitville Pike in Lancaster. Programming is also heard on FM translator W223CH at 92.5 MHz.

History
The station first signed on the air in June 1922. It is one of Pennsylvania's earliest stations. The original call sign was WGAL. The station was once housed in the historic Jasper Yeates House.  

WGAL was owned by the Steinman family, which also owned two local newspapers, the Intelligencer Journal and the Lancaster New Era. In 1947 an FM sister station went on the air, WGAL-FM, now WROZ. In 1949, the family added Pennsylvania's first television station outside Philadelphia. The TV station is now owned by The Hearst Corporation and still has the WGAL call sign. For most of its history, WGAL/WLPA was a full service radio station, airing middle of the road music, news, talk and sports. It was a long-time affiliate of the NBC Radio Network.

In the early 1990s, WLPA simulcast the audio of CNN Headline News and WGAL's local newscasts, before switching to One-on-One Sports, then Sporting News Radio (both forerunners of SportsMap). It also broadcast Philadelphia Phillies games.

In July 2005, WLPA changed to a sports radio format, first affiliating with Fox Sports Radio. On August 1, 2013, WLPA became an affiliate of ESPN Radio. The station had attempted to affiliate with ESPN Radio for some years beforehand, but was unable to do so due to its geographic proximity to another ESPN affiliate, WGLD in Manchester Township. However, that station joined CBS Sports Radio in early 2013, making the ESPN affiliation available to WLPA.

On April 1, 2015, WLPA changed format from ESPN sports to adult standards, supplied by Westwood One's America's Best Music service, returning the station to the music it once played decades ago.

On April 4, 2016, WLPA reverted back to a sports radio format, with a simulcast of the ESPN Radio programming of sister station WONN-FM, now WPPY. WLPA adopted that station's ESPN Radio 92.7 branding at that time.

On July 23, 2021, it was announced that Forever Media would purchase WLPA and its translator along with WONN-FM for a total of $400,000. This signals Hall Communications' withdrawal from the market, as the sale of 101.3 WROZ to religious broadcaster Educational Media Foundation was announced earlier that month.

The sale consummated on October 15, 2021. WLPA and its translator subsequently switched to a simulcast of the classic rock programming of sister station WYCR. The station’s call sign was changed to WRKY effective November 1, 2021.

Translator
WRKY programming is broadcast on the following translator:

References

External links

 
 
 

RKY (AM)
Radio stations established in 1922
1922 establishments in Pennsylvania
Classic rock radio stations in the United States
Radio stations licensed before 1923 and still broadcasting